Bagir Manan (born 6 October 1941) is an Indonesian jurist who served as Chief Justice of the Supreme Court of Indonesia from 2001 to 2008. and chairman of the  between 2010 and 2016. and 2013–2016. He is a professor of constitutional law at Padjadjaran University.

References

1941 births
Chief justices of the Supreme Court of Indonesia
Living people
People from Lampung
Lampung people